Gaydar is a profile-based dating website for gay and bisexual men.

History 
The Gaydar website, built initially for desktop only, was created as a tool to connect gay and bisexual men all over the world for friendships, hook-ups, dating and relationships. Users create a personal 'member' profile, which is then used to interact and contact other registered members.

It was founded in 1999 in Cape Town, South Africa, by London-based South Africans Gary Frisch and his partner Henry Badenhorst, after a friend complained that he was too busy to look for a new boyfriend. The initial idea was based upon a then current concept of a corporate intranet that was in development under the codename "RADAR" (Rapid Access And Deployment Resource) for a prominent South African advertising conglomerate by programmers Ian Van Schalkwyk and Stephen Hadden. The site was launched in November 1999.

In May 2007, Henry Badenhorst was named by the Independent on Sunday Pink List as the fourth most influential gay person in Britain, down from third place the previous year.

In 2009, Gaydar expanded into the app market, releasing its iOS and Android app as available to download from the Apple App Store and Google Play.

In May 2013, it was announced that the site had been sold to Charlie Parsons, the creator of Channel 4's The Big Breakfast.

In 2017, Gaydar relaunched its site, app and brand.

Registration 
Registered users are able to browse through online lists of users who are logged into the site at that time, or through lists of all active profiles. Users can send messages to each other and participate in chat rooms, which — except for the Australian and Irish chat rooms — tend to be dominated by UK users. Users can upgrade to a premium account to access Gaydar VIP, which offers more features and privileges. Members may add more photos into an 'album' attached to their profile that are viewable by other members. Guests face other site restrictions, such as a daily limit of 8 messages that they can send and 25 profiles that they can view, and a limit on number of chat rooms accessible at the same time. Guests cannot view archives of sent messages, and cannot use the friends list and do not have access to all search options. About a third of users are members.

Profiles 

Profiles typically include standard information on age, location, physical features, sexual predilections, hobbies, and pastimes. Profiles usually include a free format description about their owner and what they seek in a partner. There is provision for profile owners to upload a number of photographs, typically of themselves — one as the 'main photo', several as 'secondary photos', and several more as 'private photos' that can be sent as attachments to private messages.

Controversy and criticisms 

Critics allege that it facilitates barebacking (anal intercourse without a condom), though this criticism is potentially true of any dating site.

Media attention was drawn in 2003 when the website was used by Labour Party MP Chris Bryant, and in 2006, when married Liberal Democrat leadership candidate Mark Oaten used it to find gay sexual partners.

In 2011, Gaydar re-introduced "filtering" in chat rooms and member-to-member private messages, where lines containing competitors' brand names would appear to be sent but would not be delivered.

Deaths of co-founders 
The chairman and co-founder of Gaydar, Gary Frisch died unexpectedly at his home in London on 11 February 2007, aged 38 years. A verdict of misadventure was recorded by Paul Knapman, the coroner at the inquest. A pathologist, Peter Wilkins, said ketamine was found in Frisch's blood and liver. On 11 November 2017, co-founder Henry Badenhorst died unexpectedly at the age of 51. He was reported to have taken his own life.

See also

 Gaydar
 Gaydar Radio
 Homosocialization
 List of LGBT social networking services
 Timeline of online dating services
 Tinder

References

External links
 Website

LGBT-related Internet forums
Gay men's websites
Same sex online dating
LGBT social networking services
Social networking services
Online dating services
Online dating services of the United Kingdom
Online dating applications
Geosocial networking
Mobile social software
iOS software
Android (operating system) software